Rhenzo Alcón Andrade (born 21 July 2004) is a professional footballer who plays as a forward for Botafogo.

Club career
Born in Rio de Janeiro to a Brazilian father and a Bolivian mother from La Paz, Alcón started his career playing futsal with Vasco da Gama, before a move to Fluminense. Following a short spell with futsal team Bradesco, he returned to Vasco da Gama in August 2014. He returned to Fluminense, where he remained until 2018.

He went on to join Botafogo at the age of thirteen and, following his recovery from knee surgery in February 2021, signed a professional contract with the club in October of the same year. He suffered another knee injury while playing for the youth teams of Botafogo, which kept him out until November 2022.

International career
Alcón is eligible to represent both Bolivia and Brazil at international level, and became a nationalised Bolivian at the age of fifteen. He represented Bolivia at the 2019 South American U-15 Championship, scoring twice in four appearances.

References

2004 births
Living people
Footballers from Rio de Janeiro (city)
Brazilian people of Bolivian descent
Brazilian footballers
Bolivian footballers
Bolivia youth international footballers
Association football forwards
CR Vasco da Gama players
Fluminense FC players
Botafogo de Futebol e Regatas players